The 2010 South Carolina Gamecocks baseball team represented the University of South Carolina in the 2010 NCAA Division I baseball season. The Gamecocks played their home games in Carolina Stadium. The team was coached by Ray Tanner, who was in his fourteenth season at Carolina.

USC finished second in the Southeastern Conference regular season standings, and received an at-large bid to the 2010 NCAA Division I baseball tournament. The Gamecocks were designated the #1 seed and host of the Columbia Regional. Carolina went 3–0 in their Regional to advance to the Super Regionals. The Gamecocks beat Coastal Carolina in two games to win the Myrtle Beach Super Regional and advance to the 2010 College World Series. After losing the opener, the Gamecocks won their next six games to win the national championship, defeating UCLA in the CWS Championship Series in consecutive games, 7–1 and 2–1.

Regular season 
The Gamecocks won their first seven SEC series of the 2010 season, which continued a streak of ten straight dating back to the end of the 2009 season. Another carryover streak was that of Whit Merrifield, who set a USC record when he hit safely in his 26th game in a row during the March 10 contest against Valparaiso. Another school record was tied in that game, as Gamecock pitchers combined to strike out 18 batters. Scott Wingo set a USC record on March 13 when he was hit by a pitch for the 35th time in his college career.

Carolina lost the annual series against archrival Clemson for the first time since 2006 by losing two of three games against the Tigers. The March 6 game at Fluor Field was the first game between both schools at that stadium and the first game played in Greenville since the 1990 season.

Head Coach Ray Tanner recorded his 600th victory at USC with a 10–1 win over The Citadel on March 30, and his 1,000th career victory with a 2–0 win over Vanderbilt on April 11.

Overall, Carolina played nine schools that would eventually make the 2010 NCAA Tournament (Alabama, Arkansas, Auburn, The Citadel, Clemson, College of Charleston, Florida, Mississippi, Vanderbilt). The Gamecocks compiled a 16–8 record against these schools. USC finished the regular season a perfect 15–0 in their midweek games.

Postseason

SEC tournament 
Carolina entered the SEC Tournament as the #3 seed by virtue of finishing second in the Eastern Division (Florida claimed the #1 seed by winning the SEC regular season championship and Auburn claimed the #2 seed by finishing first in the Western Division). The Gamecocks would lose their first two games against Ole Miss and Auburn (both were teams that the Gamecocks won series against in the regular season) being eliminated from the tournament without posting a victory.

NCAA tournament 
Carolina was awarded the #1 seed in the Columbia Regional of the 2010 NCAA tournament. On June 4, the Gamecocks opened regional play with #4 seed Bucknell. USC trailed 5–1 before rallying for five runs in the eighth inning, going on to defeat the Bison, 9–5. On June 5, Carolina would face #3 seed in-state foe, The Citadel, whom the Gamecocks had defeated twice during the regular season. Facing Bulldog ace and MLB first-round draft pick Asher Wojciechowski, USC would again come from behind, scoring five in the seventh and another two in the ninth to overcome a 4–2 deficit for the 9–4 victory, riding Blake Cooper's career-high 12 strikeouts. On June 6, Carolina squared off against #2 seed Virginia Tech, and scored six in the sixth to defeat the Hokies, 10–2, to sweep the Columbia Regional Championship and advance to the Super Regionals.

The Gamecocks were sent on the road to the Myrtle Beach Super Regional to face #4 national seed Coastal Carolina. On June 12, Carolina defeated Coastal, 4–3, behind four early runs and another quality start by staff ace Blake Cooper. On June 13, the Gamecocks again found themselves needing to come from behind in the late-innings. Trailing the Chanticleers 9–7 in the eighth, freshman first-baseman Christian Walker became an instant hero with a 3-run blast that led to a 10–9 victory and ninth trip to Omaha for South Carolina.

College World Series 
By virtue of their Super Regional sweep of Coastal Carolina, South Carolina joined Arizona State, Clemson, Florida, Florida State, Oklahoma, TCU, and UCLA in the 2010 College World Series. Before this year's appearance, South Carolina had a 17–16 record in the CWS, with runner-up finishes in 1975, 1977 and 2002. On June 20, the Gamecocks lost their opener to Oklahoma, 4–3, in a game that was played over nine hours due to two lengthy delays for rain and lightning. Playing out of the losers' bracket with no margin for error, Carolina drubbed #1 national seed Arizona State 11–4 on June 22, scoring eight runs in the second inning to send the Sun Devils home. On June 24, the Gamecocks eliminated Oklahoma behind more late-inning heroics. Trailing 2–1 and down to their last strike in the 12th inning, Jackie Bradley Jr. singled home the tying run and following a walk to pinch-hitter Jeffery Jones, Brady Thomas lined the first pitch he saw up the middle for a walk-off RBI single. In a repeat of the 2002 CWS, Carolina found themselves in the position of having to beat Clemson twice in order to advance to the Championship Series. On June 25, Michael Roth made his first pitching start in over a year for the Gamecocks, and shut down the red-hot bats of the Tigers with a three-hit, complete-game performance in a dominating 5–1 victory. The following evening saw a rematch of the archrivals, with Carolina defeating Clemson, 4–3, and moving on to face UCLA in the CWS Finals. The Gamecocks and the Bruins were both playing for the first baseball national championship for either school, and Carolina put themselves in the driver's seat as they cruised to a 7–1 victory in the first game of the series. Game 2 would turn out to be the last CWS game ever played in historic Johnny Rosenblatt Stadium, and it was one for the ages. The Gamecocks and Bruins were locked in a pitchers' duel, and UCLA held a 1–0 lead until the bottom of the eighth when Carolina tied things up. The respective closers for the two teams would continue the pitching battle for another three innings, until the bottom of the 11th when Scott Wingo drew a leadoff walk, advanced to second on a passed ball and was moved to third on a sacrifice bunt. With one out, UCLA decided to pitch to Whit Merrifield, who lined a 2–0 pitch into right field to bring home the winning run.

Personnel

Roster 

2010 South Carolina Gamecocks Baseball Roster & Bios http://gamecocksonline.cstv.com/sports/m-basebl/mtt/scar-m-basebl-mtt.html

Coaching staff 

2010 South Carolina Gamecocks Baseball Coaches & Bios http://gamecocksonline.cstv.com/sports/m-basebl/mtt/scar-m-basebl-mtt.html#coaches

Schedule 

! style="background:#73000A;color:white;"| Regular Season (43–13)
|- valign="top" 

|- align="center" bgcolor="#ccffcc"
| 1 || February 19 ||  || Carolina Stadium || 10–3 || Cooper (1–0) || Elms (0–1) || None || 6,380 || 1–0 || –
|- align="center" bgcolor="#ccffcc"
| 2 || February 20 || Duquesne || Carolina Stadium || 13–3 || Dyson (1–0) || Gillespie (0–1) || None || 7,926 || 2–0 ||–
|- align="center" bgcolor="#ccffcc"
| 3 || February 21 || Duquesne || Carolina Stadium || 5–3 || Neff (1–0) || Heck (0–1) || None || 6,910 || 3–0 || –
|- align="center" bgcolor="#ccffcc"
| 4 || February 26 || @ || Clark-LeClair Stadium || 6–2 || Cooper (2–0) || Maness (0–2) || Taylor (1) || 3,214 || 4–0 ||–
|- align="center" bgcolor="#ffbbb"
| 5 || February 27 || @East Carolina || Clark-LeClair Stadium || 3–4 || Simmons (1–0) || Taylor (0–1) || None || 4,461 || 4–1 ||–
|- align="center" bgcolor="#ffbbb"
| 6 || February 28 || @East Carolina || Clark-LeClair Stadium || 2–4 || Mincey (1–1) || Neff (1–1) || Simmons (1) || 3,743 || 4–2 ||–
|-

|- align="center" bgcolor="ccffcc"
| 7 || March 3 ||  || Carolina Stadium || 15–0 || Belcher (1–0) || Harmon (0–1) || None|| 5,217 || 5–2 ||–
|- align="center" bgcolor="ffbbb"
| 8 || March 5 || @Clemson || Doug Kingsmore Stadium || 3–4 || Haselden (2–0) || Roth (0–1) || None || 6,346 || 5–3 ||–
|- align="center" bgcolor="ccffcc"
| 9 || March 6 || vs. Clemson || Fluor Field || 7–5 || Price (1–0) || Cruz (1–1) || Roth (1) || 7,105 || 6–3 ||–
|- align="center" bgcolor="ffbbb"
| 10 || March 7|| Clemson || Carolina Stadium  || 6–19 || Weismann (2–0) || Webb (0–1) || None || 8,214 || 6–4 ||–
|- align="center" bgcolor="ccffcc"
| 11 || March 9 ||  || Carolina Stadium || 12–4 || Mata (1–0) || Shafer (1–1) || None || 5,295 || 7–4 ||–
|- align="center" bgcolor="ccffcc"
| 12 || March 10 || Valparaiso || Carolina Stadium || 7–3 || Price (2–0) || Robinson (0–4) || None || 4,902 || 8–4 ||–
|- align="center" bgcolor="ccffcc"
| 13 || March 13 ||  || Carolina Stadium || 8–4 || Cooper (3–0) || Gormley (0–1) || None || 5,053 || 9–4 ||–
|- align="center" bgcolor="ccffcc"
| 14 || March 13 || Brown || Carolina Stadium || 10–7 || Brown (1–0) || Weidig (0–2) || Roth (2) || 5,250 || 10–4 ||–
|- align="center" bgcolor="ccffcc"
| 15 || March 14 || Brown || Carolina Stadium || 6–510 || Revan (1–0) || Kimball (0–1) || None || 5,307 || 11–4 ||–
|- align="center" bgcolor="ccffcc"
| 16 || March 16 || @ || Fluor Field || 15–0 || Belcher (2–0) || Benton (0–4) || None || 3,256 || 12–4 ||–
|- align="center" bgcolor="ccffcc"
| 17 || March 17 ||  || Carolina Stadium || 8–3 || Mata (2–0) || Lamb (1–3) || None || 5,054 || 13–4 ||–
|- align="center" bgcolor="ccffcc"
| 18 || March 19 ||  || Carolina Stadium || 4–2 || Carter (1–0) || Locante (1–1) || None || 6,211 || 14–4 ||1–0
|- align="center" bgcolor="ccffcc"
| 19 || March 20 || Tennessee || Carolina Stadium || 10–7 || Bangs (1–0) || Steckenrider (0–1) || None || 7,813 || 15–4 ||2–0
|- align="center" bgcolor="ccffcc"
| 20 || March 21 || Tennessee || Carolina Stadium || 4–0 || Webb (1–1) || McCray (2–2) || Price (1) || 5,629 || 16–4 ||3–0
|- align="center" bgcolor="ccffcc"
| 21 || March 23 || @ || J. I. Clements Stadium || 8–513 || Taylor (1–1) || Snow (0–1) || None || 2,022 || 17–4 ||–
|- align="center" bgcolor="ccffcc"
| 22 || March 26 || @ || Plainsman Park || 11–5 || Cooper (4–0) || Luckie (1–1) || None || 3,458 || 18–4 ||4–0
|- align="center" bgcolor="ccffcc"
| 23 || March 27 || @Auburn || Plainsman Park || 2–0 || Dyson (2–0) || Nelson (4–1) || Price (2) || 2,970 || 19–4 ||5–0
|- align="center" bgcolor="ffbbb"
| 24 || March 28 || @Auburn || Plainsman Park || 6–10 || Dayton (3–1) || Webb (1–2) || None || 2,316 || 19–5 ||5–1
|- align="center" bgcolor="ccffcc"
| 25 || March 30 || The Citadel || Carolina Stadium || 10–1 || Holmes (1–0) || Clarkson (1–2) || None || 6,451 || 20–5 ||–
|-

|- align="center" bgcolor="#ccffcc"
| 26 || April 2 ||  || Carolina Stadium || 10–2 || Cooper (5–0) || Graveman (1–2) || None || 7,019 || 21–5 || 6–1
|- align="center" bgcolor="#ffbbb"
| 27 || April 3 || Mississippi State || Carolina Stadium || 7–8 || Stratton (3–3) || Dyson (2–1) || Bracewell (4) || 7,012 || 21–6 || 6–2
|- align="center" bgcolor="#ccffcc"
| 28 || April 4 || Mississippi State || Carolina Stadium || 14–2 || Price (3–0) || Whitney (0–1) || None || 5,576 || 22–6 || 7–2
|- align="center" bgcolor="#ccffcc"
| 29 || April 7 ||  || Carolina Stadium || 6–3 || Holmes (2–0) || Zokan (2–1) || Roth (3) || 7,523 || 23–6 || –
|- align="center" bgcolor="#ccffcc"
| 30 || April 9 || @ || Hawkins Field || 3–2 || Cooper (6–0) || Gray (4–4) || Price (3) || 2,853 || 24–6 || 8–2
|- align="center" bgcolor="#ffbbb"
| 31 || April 10 || @Vanderbilt || Hawkins Field || 2–8  || Armstrong (5–0) || Dyson (2–2) || None || 3,197 || 24–7 || 8–3
|- align="center" bgcolor="#ccffcc"
| 32 || April 11 || @Vanderbilt || Hawkins Field || 2–0 || Brown (2–0) || Hill (3–3) || Price (4) || 2,328 || 25–7 || 9–3
|- align="center" bgcolor="#ccffcc"
| 33 || April 14 || @The Citadel || Joe Riley Park || 10–4 || Taylor (2–1) || Pritcher (2–2) || None || 4,087 || 26–7 || –
|- align="center" bgcolor="#ccffcc"
| 34 || April 16 ||  || Carolina Stadium || 5–0 || Cooper (7–0) || Rothlin (3–4) || None || 7,094 || 27–7 || 10–3
|- align="center" bgcolor="#ccffcc"
| 35 || April 17 || Ole Miss || Carolina Stadium || 9–5 || Dyson (3–2) || Barrett (6–2) || Carter (1) || 7,952 || 28–7 || 11–3
|- align="center" bgcolor="#ffbbb"
| 36 || April 18 || Ole Miss || Carolina Stadium || 4–5 || Tracy (2–2) || Taylor (2–2) || Huber (4) || 7,585 || 28–8 || 11–4
|- align="center" bgcolor="#ccffcc"
| 37 || April 20 ||  || Carolina Stadium || 4–2 || Mata (3–0) || Bumgardner (0–5) || Carter (2) || 6,409 || 29–8 || –
|- align="center" bgcolor="#ccffcc"
| 38 || April 23 || @ || Foley Field || 11–4 || Cooper (8–0) || Grimm (2–6) || None || 2,642 || 30–8 || 12–4
|- align="center" bgcolor="#ccffcc"
| 39 || April 25 || @Georgia || Foley Field || 5–0 || Dyson (4–2) || Walters (1–4) || None || 3,169 || 31–8 || 13–4
|- align="center" bgcolor="#ccffcc"
| 40 || April 25 || @Georgia || Foley Field || 8–7 || Carter (2–0) || Moseley (0–2) || None || 3,169 || 32–8 || 14–4
|- align="center" bgcolor="#ccffcc"
| 41 || April 30 || Alabama || Carolina Stadium || 9–711 || Mata (4–0) || Kilcrease (3–2) || None || 8,145 || 33–8 || 15–4
|-

|- align="center" bgcolor="ffbbb"
| 42 || May 1 || Alabama || Carolina Stadium || 4–6 || Morgan (5–2) || Dyson (4–3) || Smith (2) || 8,053 || 33–9 || 15–5
|- align="center" bgcolor="ccffcc"
| 43 || May 2 || Alabama || Carolina Stadium || 20–15 || Webb (2–2) || Wolfe (3–2) || None || 8,006 || 34–9 || 16–5
|- align="center" bgcolor="ccffcc"
| 44 || May 5 ||  || Carolina Stadium || 5–1 || Mata (5–0) || Monteith (0–2) || None || 6,014 || 35–9 || –
|- align="center" bgcolor="ccffcc"
| 45 || May 7 || @ || Cliff Hagan Stadium || 13–9 || Cooper (9–0) || Rogers (4–7) || Price (5) || 2,183 || 36–9 || 17–5
|- align="center" bgcolor="ffbbb"
| 46 || May 8 || @Kentucky || Cliff Hagan Stadium || 1–2 || Cooper (3–4) || Dyson (4–4) || Little (7) || 1,755 || 36–10 || 17–6
|- align="center" bgcolor="ffbbb"
| 47 || May 9 || @Kentucky || Cliff Hagan Stadium || 3–9 || Meyer (5–2) || Mata (5–1) || Kapteyn (2) || 1,702 || 36–11 || 17–7
|- align="center" bgcolor="ccffcc"
| 48 || May 11 ||  || Carolina Stadium || 17–4 || Belcher (3–0) || Collins (1–2) || None || 6,402 || 37–11 || –
|- align="center" bgcolor="ccffcc"
| 49 || May 12 ||  || Carolina Stadium || 10–2 || Mata (6–1) || McCready (0–6) || None || 6,573 || 38–11 || –
|- align="center" bgcolor="ccffcc"
| 50 || May 14 || @Arkansas || Baum Stadium || 3–2 || Cooper (10–0) || Smyly (7–1) || Price (6) || 9,622 || 39–11 || 18–7
|- align="center" bgcolor="ccffcc"
| 51 || May 15 || @Arkansas || Baum Stadium || 5–0 || Dyson (5–4) || Bolsinger (5–3) || None || 8,670 || 40–11 || 19–7
|- align="center" bgcolor="ccffcc"
| 52 || May 16 || @Arkansas || Baum Stadium || 5–3 || Taylor (3–2) || Pratt (3–1) || Price (7) || 8,227 || 41–11 || 20–7
|- align="center" bgcolor="ccffcc"
| 53 || May 18 ||  || Carolina Stadium || 11–6 || Neff (2–1) || Karow (0–2) || None || 6,291 || 42–11 || –
|- align="center" bgcolor="ffbbb"
| 54 || May 20 || Florida || Carolina Stadium || 2–3 || Barfield (4–0) || Cooper (10–1) || Chapman (9) || 8,188 || 42–12 || 20–8
|- align="center" bgcolor="ffbbb"
| 55 || May 21 || Florida || Carolina Stadium || 2–5 || Rodriguez (1–0) || Dyson (5–5) || Chapman (10) || 8,242 || 42–13 || 20–9
|- align="center" bgcolor="ccffcc"
| 56 || May 22 || Florida || Carolina Stadium || 11–6 || Brown (3–0) || Johnson (5–3) || None || 7,523 || 43–13 || 21–9
|-

|-
! style="background:#73000A;color:white;"| Post-Season
|-

|- align="center" bgcolor="#ffbbb"
| 57 || May 26 ||  || Regions Park || 0–3 || Pomeranz (8–2) || Belcher (3–1) || Huber (11) || 12,514 || 43–14 || 0–1
|- align="center" bgcolor="#ffbbb"
| 58 || May 27 ||  || Regions Park || 1–312 || Hubbard (5–2) || Price (3–1) || None || 5,759 || 43–15 ||0–2
|-

|- align="center" bgcolor="#ccffcc"
| 59 || June 4 ||  || Carolina Stadium || 9–5 || Roth (1–1) || Carlin (3–6) || None || 6,712 || 44–15 || 1–0
|- align="center" bgcolor="#ccffcc"
| 60 || June 5 || The Citadel || Carolina Stadium || 9–4 || Cooper (11–1) || Wojciechowski (12–3) || Price (8) || 7,418 || 45–15 ||2–0
|- align="center" bgcolor="#ccffcc"
| 61 || June 6 ||  || Carolina Stadium || 10–2 || Mata (7–1) || Price (7–4) || None || 6,233 || 46–15 ||3–0
|-

|- align="center" bgcolor="#ccffcc"
| 62 || June 12 ||  || BB&T Coastal Field || 4–3 || Cooper (12–1) || Rein (7–1) || Price (9) || 6,599 || 47–15 ||4–0
|- align="center" bgcolor="#ccffcc"
| 63 || June 13 || Coastal Carolina || BB&T Coastal Field || 10–9 || Carter (3–0) || Fleet (6–2) || Price (10) || 6,599 || 48–15 ||5–0
|-

|- align="center" bgcolor="#ffbbb"
| 64 || June 20 ||  || Rosenblatt Stadium || 3–4 || Rocha (8–2) || Cooper (12–2) || None || 22,835 || 48–16 || 5–1
|- align="center" bgcolor="#ccffcc"
| 65 || June 22 || Arizona State || Rosenblatt Stadium || 11–4 || Dyson (6–5) || Kelly (10–3) || None || 19,936 || 49–16 || 6–1
|- align="center" bgcolor="#ccffcc"
| 66 || June 24 || Oklahoma || Rosenblatt Stadium || 3–212 || Webb (3–2) || Duke (3–2) || None || 24,180 || 50–16 || 7–1
|- align="center" bgcolor="#ccffcc"
| 67 || June 25 || Clemson || Rosenblatt Stadium || 5–1 || Roth (2–1) || Leone (3–2) || None || 22,334 || 51–16 || 8–1
|- align="center" bgcolor="#ccffcc"
| 68 || June 26 || Clemson || Rosenblatt Stadium || 4–3 || Price (4–1) || Harman (8–4) || None || 12,593 || 52–16 || 9–1
|- align="center" bgcolor="#ccffcc"
| 69 || June 28 || UCLA || Rosenblatt Stadium || 7–1 || Cooper (13–2) || Cole (11–4) || None || 23,181 || 53–16 || 10–1
|- align="center" bgcolor="#ccffcc"
| 70 || June 29 || UCLA || Rosenblatt Stadium || 2–1 11 || Price (5–1) || Klein (6–1) || None || 24,390 || 54–16 || 11–1
|-

2010 South Carolina Gamecocks Baseball Schedule http://gamecocksonline.cstv.com/sports/m-basebl/sched/scar-m-basebl-sched.html

Honors and awards 
 Tyler Webb was named SEC Freshman of the Week on March 22.
 Jay Brown was named SEC Pitcher of the Week on April 12.
 Blake Cooper was named SEC Pitcher of the Week on April 19.
 Sam Dyson was named SEC Pitcher of the Week on April 26 and on May 17.
 South Carolina was named Team of the Week on May 18 by CollegeBaseballInsider.com.
 Head coach Ray Tanner was named the National Coach of the Year by Collegiate Baseball and Baseball America.
 Pitcher Blake Cooper was named third-team All-American by Collegiate Baseball.
 Pitcher Matt Price (first team) and first baseman Christian Walker (second team) were named Freshman All-Americans by Baseball America.
 Blake Cooper (P), Jackie Bradley Jr. (OF), Kyle Enders (C), Evan Marzilli (OF) and Brady Thomas (DH) were named to the Columbia Regional All-Tournament Team.
 Adrian Morales was named Most Outstanding Player of the Columbia Regional.
 South Carolina received the CWS Opening Ceremonies award for highest team GPA (3.12) of the eight schools that made it to Omaha.
 Evan Marzilli (OF), Brady Thomas (DH) and Christian Walker (1B) were named to the College World Series All-Tournament Team.
 Jackie Bradley Jr. was named Most Outstanding Player of the 2010 College World Series.

Rankings 

 NR = Not Ranked

Gamecocks in the 2010 MLB Draft 
The following members of the South Carolina Gamecocks baseball program were drafted in the 2010 Major League Baseball Draft.

References 

South Carolina Gamecocks
South Carolina Gamecocks baseball seasons
NCAA Division I Baseball Championship seasons
College World Series seasons
South Carolina
South